"Shake It" is a song by American pop band Metro Station, released as the third single (and debut British single) from the group's 2007 self-titled debut studio album.

"Shake It" was the band's first charting single, peaking at number 10 on the US Billboard Hot 100. Internationally, the song peaked within the top 10 of the charts in Australia, Austria, Canada, Germany, Ireland, Japan, New Zealand, and the United Kingdom. The single was certified Gold by the RIAA on June 13, 2008, and later Platinum that year, until finally reaching 2× Platinum status at the end of January 2009. The song has sold over 1.2 million copies in the US and over 4 million copies worldwide.

Composition
"Shake It" was written in the key of E major, but Metro Station played the song in D major for live performances.

Critical reception
"Shake It" was generally well received by music critics. Nick Levine of Digital Spy stated, "everything about this track - the fairly standard verses, the weedy vocals, the rather tedious lyrics - is passable at best. Except, crucially, for the chorus, which is big, chanty and as easy to resist." Seventeen Magazine called the track, "the perfect summer fun tune." The song has garnered over 110 million streams on Spotify.

Music video
The music video for the song "Shake It" was inspired by fans who created their own versions of the video, 63 of which the band posted as a playlist on the band's YouTube account. The band has commented that the final product was based on the cult film The Warriors, with rival dance crews in place of gangs. MTV calls the video, "the musical equivalent of Snakes on a Plane." 

The video features the four band members as they enter the Los Angeles Theatre. Once inside the theatre, the band performs the song while various dancers compete against each other around the band members. Cameos are made by online celebrity Jeffree Star and vocalist/guitarist Trace Cyrus' ex-girlfriend Hanna Beth as audience members watching the dancers perform. The video ends with the band and everyone else being forced to exit the theatre by the police.

Awards and nominations

Track listings
Digital single
 "Shake It" - 2:59

CD single
 "Shake It" - 3:03
 "Comin' Around" - 2:40

UK CD single
 "Shake It" (Radio Mix) - 3:04
 "Shake It (Lenny B Remix - Extended Version)" - 7:15
 "Comin' Around" - 2:40

Digital Remix single
 "Shake It" [The Lindbergh Palace Remix] - 6:25
 "Shake It" [Lenny B Remix] - 3:22

Charts

Weekly charts

Year-end charts

Decade-end charts

Certifications

Release history

Use in media
 In the soundtrack of The House Bunny and on So You Think You Can Dance Canada.
 On the evening of April 7, 2008, Disney Channel had a bump that said: Shake It [Metro Station].
 It appeared on the season eight premiere of American Idol.
 It is also featured as a downloadable song for the Xbox 360 karaoke game, Lips.
 It was covered by a Portuguese boy band to be used in Sweet Strawberries (original title: Morangos Com Açúcar) season 7 soundtrack.
 The song was featured in 90210 when Annie and Ty were on a date in San Francisco.
 The song was featured in the episode "All About Appearances" from the series Privileged.
 The song was played during the opening of the episode "When Cougars Attack" of the show The Whole Truth, which first aired on October 27, 2010.
 The song was featured on a television commercial for Schwarzkopf's Live Colour XXL Shake It Up Foam product in the United Kingdom. The commercial first aired on British commercial television networks in December 2011.
 The song accompanied the Fastrack commercials for watches in India. The commercial first aired on Indian commercial television networks in October 2013.
 The song is frequently used by social media star Lenarr Young as the music for one of his characters named Zac.
 The song can be heard in the Grey's Anatomy spin-off show Private Practice in season 4, episode 12 as the first song Bizzy and Susan dance to after getting married.

References

External links
 

2008 singles
Metro Station (band) songs
Song recordings produced by S*A*M and Sluggo
2007 songs
Columbia Records singles